Binary distribution may refer to:

Binary distribution, geographical term
Software distribution, a method of software distribution, where the software is given out in a compiled form
Bernoulli distribution, a discrete probability distribution which compels the random variable to take one of two values.